Komering is a Lampungic language spoken by Komering people, an indigenous ethnic group native to Komering regions alongside the Komering River in southern hemisphere of Sumatra island Indonesia.

Location 
Komering in the Lampung Province, South Sumatra Province in southern Sumatra, along the Komering River.

Classification 
Komering language belongs to the Lampungic linguistic family, which is one of the groups within the Austronesian family.

Phonology

Consonants 

A voiced fricative  also occurs, but only as a result of foreign loanwords.

Vowels

Vocabulary 
Examples of basic Komering words:

Notes and references

Sources 
 Adelaar, Alexander, The Austronesian Languages of Asia and Madagascar: A Historical Perspective, The Austronesian Languages of Asia and Madagascar, pp. 1–42, Routledge Language Family Series, Londres, Routledge, 2005, 
 Walker, Dale F., A Lexical Study of Lampung Dialects, Miscellaneous Studies in Indonesian and Languages in Indonesia, Part I (editor: John W. M. Verhaar), NUSA Linguistic Studies in Indonesian and Languages of Indonesia, Volume 1, pp. 11–21, Jakarta, Badan Penyelenggara Seri NUSA, 1975.
 Walker, Dale F., A Grammar of the Lampung Language: the Pesisir Dialect of Way Lima, NUSA Linguistic Studies in Indonesian and Languages of Indonesia, Volume 2, Jakarta, Badan Penyelenggara Seri NUSA, 1976.
 Sofjan Abdurrahman, and Colin Yallop. A Brief Outline of Komering Phonology and Morphology, Miscellaneous studies in Indonesian and languages in Indonesia, Part VI (editor: Amran Halim), NUSA Linguistic Studies in Indonesian and Languages of Indonesia, Volume 7, pp. 11-18, Jakarta, Universitas Katolik Indonesia Atma Jaya, 1979.

See also 

Lampungic languages
Sumatran languages
Languages of Indonesia